Vijaya Kuweni is a 2012 Sri Lankan Sinhala epic biographical history film directed by Sugath Samarakoon and produced by Gayan Ranadheera. It stars Dulani Anuradha and Roger Seneviratne in lead roles along with Cletus Mendis and Buddhadasa Vithanarachchi. Music composed by Nadeeka Guruge. It is the 1162nd Sri Lankan film in the Sinhala cinema.

The film is about the legends of Ceylon's first king and his yaksha clan queen. The film successfully completed 50 days. The DVD and the screenplay of the film was released in December 2013.

Plot

Cast
 Dulani Anuradha as Kuweni
 Roger Seneviratne as King Vijaya
 Buddhadasa Vithanarachchi as Anurdha Purohita
 Cletus Mendis as Upatissa Purohita
 Sarath Dikkumbura as Vijitha amathi
 Rinsley Weeraratna as Uruwela amathi
 Mervin Silva as Yaksha chief
 Sandun Wijesiri as King Sinhabahu
 Thilak Kumara Rathnayake as Juthindar Senadhipathi
 Wilson Karunaratne as Chief of Yaksha clan
 Sumith Mudannayake as Kalasena
 Anura Dharmasiriwardena as Ranadheegha
 Wasanthi Ranwala as Seesapatika
 Rohitha B. Perera as Udeni amathi
 Rupun Ranadheera as Jeevahatta
 Amandi Sanjana as Disala
 Susil Perera as Prathidhara
 Sandun Wijesiri as Sinhabahu
 Sumith Mudannayaka as King Kalasena
 Sanjaya Samarakoon as Yaksha Kumaru
 Miyuri Samarasinghe

Awards
 2013 SIGNIS Award for the Best Actress - Dulani Anuradha

See also
 List of Asian historical drama films

References

External links
මහා වංශයට අභියෝග කළේ කොහොමද?
මහාවංශය නොකියවූ අපේ වංශයේ කතාව විජය කුවේණි

2012 films
2010s Sinhala-language films
Films set in the Pre Anuradhapura period